Denys Molchanov and Igor Zelenay were the defending champions but chose to defend their title with different partners. Molchanov partnered Hans Podlipnik Castillo but lost in the quarterfinals to Jebavý and Zelenay. Zelenay partnered Roman Jebavý but lost in the final to Frederik Nielsen and Tim Pütz.

Nielsen and Pütz won the title after defeating Jebavý and Zelenay 4–6, 7–6(7–4), [11–9] in the final.

Seeds

Draw

References

External links
 Main draw

Slovak Open - Doubles
2019 Doubles